Maui Tacos is a fast casual franchise restaurant that serves Maui-Mex food with a fusion of Hawaiian flavors . The first Maui Tacos was opened by Mark Ellman in 1993 in Nāpili, Maui, Hawaii. Ellman opened six more locations in Hawaii before opening his first store in the mainland in 1998. Maui Tacos now has 21 restaurants in 11 states (including the District of Columbia) and recently opened its sixth Maui location, in Kalama Village, Kihei. In June 2009, the company's eight Hawaii locations were sold to Maui Tacos International, the New York-based company that operated the mainland locations under a franchise agreement.

The menu includes tacos, burritos, quesadillas, nachos, enchiladas, and salads.

See also
 Taco
 Mexican cuisine
 List of restaurants in Hawaii

References

External links
Maui Tacos website

Fast-food chains of the United States
Fast-food Mexican restaurants
Hawaiian fusion cuisine
Hispanic and Latino American culture in Hawaii
Mexican fusion cuisine
Restaurants established in 1993
Restaurants in Hawaii
1993 establishments in Hawaii
2009 mergers and acquisitions